Jim Quondamatteo (October 7, 1927 – November 16, 2006), a lifelong resident of Hamilton, Ontario, was a championship offensive guard for three professional Canadian football teams.

Quondamatteo started his career with the Hamilton Tigers in 1948, but moved to the Montreal Alouettes in 1949, playing 12 games and helping them win their first Grey Cup. He then played for the Edmonton Eskimos for six seasons (1950 to 1955.) As an unsung hero, blocking for greats like Jackie Parker, Normie Kwong, Rollie Miles, Bernie Faloney, Don Getty and Johnny Bright, he helped the Eskimos win two Grey Cup games, in 1954 and 1955.

He was past President of the Hamilton Real Estate Board and a prominent restaurateur.

References

1927 births
2006 deaths
Canadian football offensive linemen
Edmonton Elks players
Hamilton Tiger-Cats players
Montreal Alouettes players
Sportspeople from Hamilton, Ontario
Players of Canadian football from Ontario